Fabio Tavares may refer to:
Fabinho (footballer, born 1993) (Fábio Henrique Tavares), Brazilian footballer
Fábio Tavares (footballer, born 1988), Portuguese former football forward
Fábio Tavares (footballer, born 2001), Portuguese football forward for Coventry City